Marina Vannucci (born 1966) is an Italian statistician, the Noah Harding Professor and Chair of Statistics at Rice University, the past president of the International Society for Bayesian Analysis, and the former editor-in-chief of Bayesian Analysis. Topics in her research include wavelets, feature selection, and cluster analysis in Bayesian statistics.

Education and career
Vannucci earned a bachelor's degree in mathematics in 1992, from the University of Florence. She completed her doctorate in statistics in 1996 at the same institution. Her dissertation, supervised by Antonio Moro, was On the Application of Wavelets in Statistics.
After postdoctoral research at the University of Kent, she joined the faculty at Texas A&M University in 1998, and moved to Rice in 2007.

She was editor-in-chief of Bayesian Analysis for 2013–2015,
and was elected president of the International Society for Bayesian Analysis for the 2018 term.

Awards and honors
Vannucci is a fellow of the American Statistical Association (2006), the Institute of Mathematical Statistics (2009), the American Association for the Advancement of Science (2012), and the International Society for Bayesian Analysis (2014), and an elected member of the International Statistical Institute (2007).
The citation for her IMS fellowship credits her "for fundamental contributions to the theory and practice of Bayesian methods for variable selection, and of wavelet-based modeling, and for mentorship of young researchers". She was given the Noah Harding Chair in 2016.

References

External links
Home page

1966 births
Living people
American women statisticians
Italian statisticians
University of Florence alumni
Texas A&M University faculty
Rice University faculty
Elected Members of the International Statistical Institute
Fellows of the American Association for the Advancement of Science
Fellows of the American Statistical Association
Fellows of the Institute of Mathematical Statistics
21st-century American women